Howard S. Berger is a filmmaker, co-winner of the "Best Screenplay" award for Love and Support (Dances With Films Festival, 2001), and winner of a Fantafestival (Italy, 1996) film award for his film Original Sins.

In October 2007, he and long-time friend and collaborator Kevin Marr re-dubbed themselves "The Flying Maciste Brothers" and started the cinema-related website "Destructible Man", which deals exclusively with the literal and figurative uses of the special effect of the dummy-death in film.

Filmography
 A Life in the Death of Joe Meek (2012) 
 DJ Khaled Makes a Video: Grammy Family (2006) (TV)
 Lil Jon Makes a Video: Snap Yo Fingers (2006) (TV)
 DJ Khaled Makes a Video: Holla at Me (2006) (TV)
 Ying Yang Twins Make a Video (2005) (TV)
 Original Sins (1994)

References

External links
 
 "Destructible Man", official site
A Life In The Death Of Joe Meek Facebook

Ward Melville High School alumni
American male screenwriters
Living people
Year of birth missing (living people)